The Athletics at the 2016 Summer Paralympics – Women's 800 metres T34 event at the 2016 Paralympic Games took place on 16 September 2016, at the Estádio Olímpico João Havelange.

Final 
18:11 16 September 2016:

Notes

Athletics at the 2016 Summer Paralympics